This is a list of the electoral history of Donald Rumsfeld.

U.S. House of Representatives elections

Illinois's 13th congressional district, 1962 (Republican primary):

Donald Rumsfeld - 47,037 (67.71%)
Marion E. Burks - 19,037 (27.40%)
Raymond Albert Morley - 2,187 (3.15%)
Edward L. Gordy

Illinois's 13th congressional district, 1962:

Donald Rumsfeld (R) - 139,230 (63.52%)
John A. Kennedy (D) - 79,419 (36.23%)
Write-ins - 542 (0.25%)

Illinois's 13th congressional district, 1964:

Donald Rumsfeld (R) (inc.) - 165,129 (57.82%)
Lynn A. Williams (D) - 120,449 (42.18%)

Illinois's 13th congressional district, 1966:

Donald Rumsfeld (R) (inc.) - 158,769 (76.01%)
James L. McCabe (D) - 50,107 (23.99%)

Illinois's 13th congressional district, 1968:

Donald Rumsfeld (R) (inc.) - 186,714 (72.74%)
David C. Baylor (D) - 69,987 (27.26%)

Republican National Conventions

1976 Republican National Convention (Vice Presidential tally):

Bob Dole - 1,921 (85.04%)
Abstaining - 103 (4.56%)
Jesse Helms - 103 (4.56%)
Ronald Reagan - 27 (1.20%)
Phil Crane - 23 (1.02%)
John Grady - 19 (0.84%)
Louis Frey - 9 (0.40%)
Anne Armstrong - 6 (0.27%)
Howard Baker - 6 (0.27%)
William F. Buckley - 4 (0.18%)
John B. Connally - 4 (0.18%)
David C. Treen - 4 (0.18%)
Alan Steelman - 3 (0.13%)
Edmund Bauman - 2 (0.09%)
Bill Brock - 2 (0.09%)
Paul Laxalt - 2 (0.09%)
Elliot Richardson - 2 (0.09%)
Richard Schweiker - 2 (0.09%)
William E. Simon - 2 (0.09%)
Jack Wellborn - 2 (0.09%)
James Allen - 1 (0.04%)
Ray Barnhardt - 1 (0.04%)
George H. W. Bush - 1 (0.04%)
Pete Domenici - 1 (0.04%)
James B. Edwards - 1 (0.04%)
Frank S. Glenn - 1 (0.04%)
David Keane - 1 (0.04%)
James McClure - 1 (0.04%)
Nancy Palm - 1 (0.04%)
Donald Rumsfeld - 1 (0.04%)
John W. Sears - 1 (0.04%)
Roger Staubach - 1 (0.04%)
Steve Symms - 1 (0.04%)

1980 Republican National Convention (Vice Presidential tally):

George H. W. Bush - 1,832 (93.33%)
Jesse Helms - 54 (2.75%)
Jack Kemp - 42 (2.14%)
Phil Crane - 23 (1.17%)
James R. Thompson - 5 (0.26%)
John M. Ashbrook - 1 (0.05%)
Howard Baker - 1 (0.05%)
Henry J. Hyde - 1 (0.05%)
Donald Rumsfeld - 1 (0.05%)
Eugene Schroeder - 1 (0.05%)
William E. Simon - 1 (0.05%)
Guy Vander Jagt - 1 (0.05%)

See also

 Gerald Ford
 George H. W. Bush
 George W. Bush
Known and Unknown: A Memoir
 List of United States Secretaries of Defense by time in office
 Robert McNamara
 'There are known knowns'
 United States Secretary of Defense

References 

Rumsfeld, Donald
Donald Rumsfeld